CNB Ecuador 2020 was the first edition of Concurso Nacional de Belleza Ecuador, after Miss World Ecuador pageant was renamed. This pageant selects the representatives to Miss World 2021, Miss Supranational 2021 and Miss Grand International 2020. The pageant was planned to be held on May 23, 2020, in the city of Portoviejo, Manabí; but due to the COVID-19 pandemic, it was cancelled and the pageant was held in a virtual selection where Ámar Pacheco resulted as the eventual winner. Ámar won the title. For obtaining the highest score in the Fast Tracks. The announcement of the results of the selection was made on the same planned date through Instagram. For very first time, the organization allows cities to be represented at the pageant. Among the contestants, the organization selected the representatives to Miss World 2020, Miss Supranational 2020, Miss Grand International 2020 and Miss Intercontinental 2020. The representatives were official crowned in a special ceremony held September 1 on De Casa en Casa TV show. The four contestants were previously chosen in a virtual selection due to the COVID-19 pandemic, was streaming by TC Television. Mariuxi Idrovo, Miss World Ecuador 2019, crowned her successor, Ámar Pacheco at the event. And the others representatives was crowned preceded by Justeen Cruz, Lisseth Naranjo and Paola Zamora.

Results

Placements

§ Naranjo directly entered into Top 5 after winning Miss Fan Vote

Fast-Track

Contestants
Initially, 20 contestants were selected to compete for the title of Miss World Ecuador 2020. But, due to the COVID-19 pandemic, 10 contestants decided not to compete in this edition, postponing their participation until 2021.

Notes

Debuts

 Guayaquil
 Quito
 Zaruma

Withdrawals

 Bolívar
 Cañar
 Chimborazo
 Esmeraldas
 Galápagos
 Imbabura
 Loja
 Los Ríos
 Morona Santiago
 New Model Magazine
 Santa Elena
 Santo Domingo

Did not compete

Due to the COVID-19 pandemic, the organization decided to choose the winner through a virtual selection, resulting in the withdrawal of 10 contestants.

 Cañar - Dayanna Lucía Méndez Espinoza
 Chimborazo - Luisa Fernanda Moreno Carrillo
 Esmeraldas - Lisette Arroyo De León 
 Galápagos - Doménica María Cedeño Garzón 
 Loja - Viviana Guisella Torres Montaño
 Los Ríos - Yomira Lilibeth Morante Cedeño
 New Model Magazine - Andrea Victoria Aguilera Paredes 
 Portoviejo - Ana Carolina Zambrano De la Cruz 
 Santa Elena - Karolaynne Polet Hidalgo Alfaro
 Santo Domingo - Darian Micaela Pozo Quiñónez

Replacements

Some girls that were selected in the casting. Decide to not enter in the competition due to studies, jobs or personal issues.
  Guayaquil  - Renata Nicole Salem Rodríguez
 Guayaquil - María Mercedes Pesantes Cabrera
 Pichincha - Estefanía Salgado
 Santo Domingo - María Camila Espinoza Paz

Crossovers 
Miss Ecuador

 2017:  Manabí: Marjorie Vivas (as  Santo Domingo)
 2018:  Azuay: Lisseth Naranjo (Reina Hispanoamericana Ecuador)

Reina de Guayaquil

 2015:  Guayaquil: Ámar Pacheco (Virreina de Guayaquil)

MIss Ecuador New Jersey

 2018:  USA Community: Justeen Cruz (Winner)

Reina Hispanoamericana

 2018:  Azuay: Lisseth Naranjo ( 5th Runner-Up; as )
Miss Tourism  World

 2019:  Manabí: Marjorie Vivas (as )

References

Beauty pageants in Ecuador
2020
2020 beauty pageants